The 1997 North Texas Mean Green football team represented the University of North Texas in the 1997 NCAA Division I-A football season. The Mean Green played their home games at the Fouts Field in Denton, Texas, and competed in the Big West Conference. They were led by fourth-year head coach Matt Simon. The team finished the regular season with a 4-7 overall record with a 2-3 mark in Big West play. Simon was fired at the conclusion of the season.

Previous season
North Texas failed to improve on their 5-6 record from 1996.

"Do you believe in the Mean Green?"
Despite a rough season in which North Texas failed to qualify for a bowl game, the 1997 team managed to pull of one of the signature wins in program history on the road over Texas Tech. The Mean Green led the Red Raiders 30-27 in the dying minutes at Jones Stadium in Lubbock. As a final desperation heave into the end zone was batted down incomplete by the North Texas secondary to secure the upset, play-by-play voice George Dunham exclaimed "Do you believe in the Mean Green?" The call became a rallying cry for Mean Green fans, and is still prominently used by the university to this day.

Schedule

References

North Texas
North Texas Mean Green football seasons
North Texas Mean Green football